This is a list of palaces in Iran.

A palace is a grand residence, especially a royal residence, or the home of a head of state or some other high-ranking dignitary, such as a bishop or archbishop. The word is derived from the Latin name palātium, for Palatine Hill in Rome which housed the Imperial residences. Most European languages have a version of the term (palais, palazzo, palacio, etc.), and many use it for a wider range of buildings than English.  In many parts of Europe, the equivalent term is also applied to large private houses in cities, especially of the aristocracy; often the term for a large country house is different.  Many historic palaces are now put to other uses such as parliaments, museums, hotels, or office buildings. The word is also sometimes used to describe a lavishly ornate building used for public entertainment or exhibitions, such as a movie palace.

List of palaces in Iran

References 

Palaces
Iran